The 2004 American Le Mans at Mid-Ohio was the second race for the 2004 American Le Mans Series season held at Mid-Ohio sports car course.  It took place on June 27, 2004.

Official results

Class winners in bold.  Cars failing to complete 70% of winner's distance marked as Not Classified (NC).

Statistics
 Pole Position - #16 Dyson Racing - 1:12.123
 Fastest Lap - #38 ADT Champion Racing - 1:14.636
 Distance - 
 Average Speed -

External links
 

M
Sports Car Challenge of Mid-Ohio
2004 in sports in Ohio